In the 1850 Iowa State Senate elections, Iowa voters elected state senators to serve in the third Iowa General Assembly. Elections were held for 11 of the state senate's 19 seats. State senators serve four-year terms in the Iowa State Senate.

The general election took place in 1850.

Following the previous election in 1848, Democrats had control of the Iowa Senate with 11 seats to Whigs' eight seats.

To claim control of the chamber from Democrats, the Whigs needed to net two Senate seats.

Democrats maintained control of the Iowa State Senate following the 1850 general election with the balance of power shifting to Democrats holding 14 seats and Whigs having five seats (a net gain of 3 seats for Democrats). Democratic Senator Enos Lowe was chosen as the President of the Iowa Senate for the third General Assembly, succeeding Democratic Senator John Jackson Selman in that leadership position.

Summary of Results 
 Note: The holdover Senators not up for re-election are unlisted on this table.

Source:

Detailed Results
NOTE: The Iowa General Assembly does not provide detailed vote totals for Iowa State Senate elections in 1850.

See also
 Elections in Iowa

External links
District boundaries were redrawn before the 1850 general election for the Iowa Senate:
Iowa Senate Districts 1846-1849 map
Iowa Senate Districts 1850-1851 map

References

Iowa Senate
Iowa
Iowa Senate elections